The 1981 Giro d'Italia was the 64th edition of the Giro d'Italia, one of cycling's Grand Tours. The Giro began in Trieste, with a prologue individual time trial on 13 May, and Stage 10 occurred on 25 May with a stage to Cascia. The race finished in Verona on 7 June.

Prologue
13 May 1981 — Trieste,  (ITT)

Stage 1a
14 May 1981 — Trieste to Bibione,

Stage 1b
14 May 1981 — Lignano Sabbiadoro to Bibione,  (TTT)

Stage 2
15 May 1981 — Bibione to Ferrara,

Stage 3
16 May 1981 — Bologna to Recanati,

Rest day 1
17 May 1981

Stage 4
18 May 1981 — Recanati to Lanciano,

Stage 5
19 May 1981 — Marina di San Vito to Rodi Garganico,

Stage 6
20 May 1981 — Rodi Garganico to Bari,

Stage 7
21 May 1981 — Bari to Potenza,

Stage 8
22 May 1981 — Sala Consilina to Cosenza,

Stage 9
23 May 1981 — Cosenza to Reggio Calabria,

Rest day 2
24 May 1981

Stage 10
25 May 1981 — Rome to Cascia,

References

1981 Giro d'Italia
Giro d'Italia stages